Islamic TV was Bangladeshi Bengali-language satellite and cable religious television channel. The owner of the channel was Said Iskandar, the younger brother of the former Prime Minister Khaleda Zia. Its head office was in Banglamotor, Dhaka. In 2013, the Bangladesh Telecommunication Regulatory Commission shut Islamic TV down, along with Diganta TV. Prior to its shutdown, it was Bangladesh's only religious television channel.

See also
 Peace TV Bangla
 List of television stations in Bangladesh

References

External links
 Islamic TV website.

Islamic organisations based in Bangladesh
Television channels in Bangladesh
Islamic television networks
Mass media in Dhaka
Television channels and stations established in 2007
 Television channels and stations disestablished in 2013
Religious television channels in Bangladesh
Defunct television channels in Bangladesh